Larry Vern Erickson (February 8, 1936 – October 8, 2013) was an American novelty song vocalist.

Biography
Verne recorded two U.S. Billboard Hot 100 chart hit singles in 1960, "Mister Livingston" (No. 75) and "Mr. Custer" (No. 1, and No. 9 R&B). "Mr. Custer" was written by Fred Darian, Al De Lory, and Joe Van Winkle. The record sold over one million copies, earning a gold disc. In the UK, "Mr. Custer" was successfully covered by Charlie Drake. "Mr. Custer" was featured on an album of novelty songs recorded by Verne called Mister Larry Verne, which was released that same year.

After growing tired of the music industry, Verne quit to become a successful builder of Hollywood film sets, which he did for 35 years before retiring.

Death
Verne died on October 8, 2013, of heart failure in Sylmar, California, at the age of 77. He had long suffered from Alzheimer's disease and had suffered three strokes.

References

External links

American male singers
1936 births
2013 deaths
Musicians from Minneapolis
Era Records artists
Deaths from dementia in California
Deaths from Alzheimer's disease
Singers from Minnesota